The Val Pola landslide (Val Pola rock avalanche) happened in Valtellina, Lombardy, Northern Italian Alps, on July 28, 1987 and resulted in the Valtellina disaster (destruction of villages, road closure, and flooding threat) with a total cost of 400 million euros.  The calamity affected the provinces of Sondrio, Brescia, Bergamo, Lecco, and Como.

During June and July 1987 Valtellina witnessed an exceptionally high rainfall accompanied with rapid glacier melting due to the relatively high altitude of the 0 degree isotherm. As a result, the Val Pola Creek significantly eroded its valley flanks, including the area of debris accumulation of post-glacial landslides. This resulted in a fracture which detached an estimated volume of 35–45 million cubic metres of old debris from the Northern slope of the Mount Zandila (Eastern side of Pizzo Coppetto) first detected on July 25. On July 26 evacuations of local villages started. The fracture eventually produced a rapid rock avalanche with subsequent shallow landslides of the Val Pola sides and a debris flow along the Val Pola thalweg. The flow entrained an estimated 5–8 million cubic meters of debris. The created alluvial fan dammed the Adda River and created a lake. The mass ran about 1.5 km downstream and generated an upstream mud wave 35 m high which traveled about 2.7 km. 

Twenty-two people were killed by the main landslide, which created a huge wave in the temporary lake caused by a previous, smaller landslide.

The landslide resulted in a 35 m deepening of the Val Pola canyon.

The debris from the Val Pola rock avalanche and landslide impounded on the Adda River creating a lake with 6 million cubic meters of water. The landslide itself obliterated 5 villages and six hamlets with 43 people dying of various disaster-related causes. The total cost of the disaster  and several months of its mitigation was about 400 million euros.

The resulting lake created the floodability threat, because the accumulated huge amount of water threatened to breach the debris dam and flood the Adda valley. Efforts to mitigate the threat included evacuation of about 25,000 people downstream, works to stabilize the debris tongue to prevent spill-over with subsequent dam breach, and works to drain the lake in a controllable manner. 

The disaster coincided with the change of the government of Italy, including the replacement of the Minister of Civil Protection, which resulted in a certain amount of policy vacuum and non-optimal decisions.

By appointment of the Ministry of Civil Protection, a large monitoring system was installed on many different sites throughout the Valtellina, to check the progress of the landslide phenomena.

In July 2007, a civil protection national exercise, Valtellina 2007, was carried out which simulated hydraulic and hydrogeological risk similar to that of the 1987 disaster.

In Italian
The corresponding article in the Italian language can be found here:
https://it.wikipedia.org/wiki/Alluvione_della_Valtellina_del_1987

References

Landslides in Italy
1987 in Italy
Landslides in 1987
Floods in Italy
Province of Sondrio
Province of Brescia
Province of Bergamo
Province of Lecco
Province of Como
History of Lombardy
July 1987 events in Europe